The Women's 12.5 kilometre mass start biathlon competition of the Vancouver 2010 Olympics was held at Whistler Olympic Park in Whistler, British Columbia on 21 February 2010.

Results 

Teja Gregorin was the only competitor who failed the 2017 doping retests from the 2010 Winter Olympics. In October 2017, the International Biathlon Union said that her two samples tested positive for GHRP-2, a banned substance which stimulates the body to produce more growth hormone, in samples taken the week before competition started. She was disqualified in December 2017.

References

External links
 2010 Winter Olympics results: Women's 12.5 km Mass Start, from https://web.archive.org/web/20091025194336/http://www.vancouver2010.com/; retrieved 2010-02-20.

Mass start